Words and Music is a 1948 American biographical musical film loosely based on the creative partnership of the composer Richard Rodgers and lyricist Lorenz Hart. The film stars Mickey Rooney as Hart and Tom Drake as Rodgers, along with Janet Leigh, Betty Garrett, Ann Sothern and numerous musical stars. It was the second in a series of MGM biopics about Broadway composers; it was preceded by Till the Clouds Roll By (Jerome Kern, 1946) and followed by Three Little Words (Kalmar and Ruby, 1950) and Deep in My Heart (Sigmund Romberg, 1954).

The film is best remembered for featuring the final screen pairing of Rooney and Judy Garland, and for the lavish showcasing of the Rodgers and Hart catalogue of songs. The script, as in many similar films of the era, was heavily fictionalized. It sanitized Hart's complex psychological problems and self-destructive behavior, which led to the break-up of the writing partnership and contributed to Hart's early death. In keeping with cultural taboos of the time, the film also completely ignored Hart's homosexuality. (Thanks to the same taboos, The New York Times reviewer Bosley Crowther ridiculed the film's inaccurate portrayal of Hart but did not specify what was inaccurate.)

The introduction to the film is staged as if composer Richard Rodgers were actually playing himself. Actor Tom Drake appears alone in character, identifies himself as Rodgers and tells the audience it is about to see the story of his collaboration with Lorenz Hart. (Contemporary posters from the film featured the faces of most major cast members, including Rooney, but did not show the face of Drake, and his name was in smaller type than those of the other main stars.)

Though the film performed very well at the box office, it proved to be quite an expensive production and, as a result, failed to recoup its cost in its first release. The film was issued on DVD in 2007 by Warner Bros. and extras included video and audio outtakes. Among these were two songs deleted from the film sung by Perry Como - "Lover" and "You're Nearer".

Plot
Aspiring lyricist Lorenz "Larry" Hart needs a composer for his music, so Herb Fields introduces him to Richard "Dick" Rodgers and a partnership is born in 1919. They struggle to achieve success, however, and Dick ultimately leaves the business to sell children's apparel.

Larry becomes impressed with singer Peggy Lorgan McNeil, personally and professionally. But when a show by him and Dick is finally bound for Broadway, his promise to Peggy to play the starring role is ruined because Joyce Harmon is hired to play the part. Dick is attracted to Joyce, but is judged too young to be involved with her, then too old for another woman he meets, Dorothy Feiner. A string of hit songs and shows follows, but Larry seems unable to enjoy the success.

After fighting depression, things begin looking up for Larry as soon as Judy Garland agrees to do a movie with Rodgers and Hart music in it. Larry buys a home in California but can't shake his sorrow, even after Dorothy marries Dick and invites Larry to share their home. Larry attends a last show of theirs in New York City, then collapses and dies outside the theater. Dick later leads a tribute to Larry's career.

Cast

 Tom Drake as Richard Rodgers
 Bill Lee provides Richard Rodgers' singing voice 
 Mickey Rooney as Lorenz Hart
 Janet Leigh as Dorothy Feiner Rodgers
 Marshall Thompson as Herbert Fields
 Betty Garrett as Peggy Lorgan McNeil
 Jeanette Nolan as Mrs. Hart
 Ann Sothern as Joyce Harmon
 Perry Como as Eddie Lorrison Anders / Himself, in Finale
 Cyd Charisse as Margo Grant
 Eileen Wilson provides Margo Grant's singing voice 
 Richard Quine as Ben Feiner Jr.
 Emory Parnell as Mr. Feiner

Guest appearances:
 June Allyson performs "Thou Swell"
 Lena Horne performs "Where or When" and "The Lady Is a Tramp"
 Judy Garland performs "I Wish I Were in Love Again" and "Johnny One Note"
 Mel Tormé performs "Blue Moon"
 Gene Kelly and Vera-Ellen dance "Slaughter on Tenth Avenue"

Songs 
 "Manhattan"
 "There's a Small Hotel"
 "Mountain Greenery"
 "Where's that Rainbow?"
 "On Your Toes"
 "We'll Have A Blue Room"
 "Thou Swell"
 "Where or When"
 "The Lady Is a Tramp"
 "I Wish I Were in Love Again"
 "Johnny One Note"
 "Blue Moon"
 "Slaughter on Tenth Avenue"
 "With a Song in My Heart"

Production
The film was originally budgeted at $2,659,065.

Reception
The film earned $3,453,000 in the US and Canada and $1,099,000 overseas but because of its high cost recorded a loss of $371,000.

The film is recognized by American Film Institute in these lists:
 2004: AFI's 100 Years...100 Songs:
 "The Lady Is a Tramp" – Nominated
 2006: AFI's Greatest Movie Musicals – Nominated

References

External links
 
 
 
 
 The Judy Garland Online Discography "Words And Music" pages.

1948 films
1940s biographical films
1948 musical films
American biographical films
American musical films
Biographical films about musicians
1940s English-language films
Films about composers
Films about musical theatre
Films directed by Norman Taurog
Films produced by Arthur Freed
Films scored by Lennie Hayton
Jukebox musical films
Metro-Goldwyn-Mayer films
Musical films based on actual events
Cultural depictions of classical musicians
Cultural depictions of American men
1940s American films